Seattle Men's Chorus (SMC) is an LGBTQ community chorus based in Seattle, Washington.  The group was founded in 1979, and today is, along with Seattle Women's Chorus, the largest community choral organization in North America. SMC is a member of GALA Choruses and Chorus America.

SMC has been led by conductor and artistic director, Paul Caldwell, since 2016.

Performances
SMC performs several regularly scheduled concerts each year, regularly hosting celebrity guests such as Kristin Chenoweth, Tituss Burgess, Leslie Jordan, Kelli O'Hara, Betty Buckley and Debbie Reynolds, to name but a few.

Discography 

 Bustin' Out All Over
 Captured Live!!
 Fruit of the Month Club
 Holiday Traditions
 Home
 Joy
 Over The Rainbow! 2000
 The Pink Album
 Silver Bells
 Snowbound!
 Soul Full
 Swellegant Elegance
 UnderCover
 We Are Family

See also

GALA Choruses (Gay and Lesbian Association of Choruses)

References

External links 
 Official Website Seattle Men's Chorus
 Stephen R. Blair Papers. 1919-1996. 1 cubic foot (2 boxes).

1979 establishments in Washington (state)
Choirs in Washington (state)
Gay culture in Washington (state)
Gay men's choruses
LGBT culture in Seattle
Musical groups established in 1979